Excuse Me is a 1911 play by Rupert Hughes. It may refer to:

Film
Excuse Me (1915 film), an American silent comedy film based on the play by Rupert Hughes
Excuse Me (1925 film), an American silent comedy film based on the play by Rupert Hughes
Excuse Me (2003 film), an Indian Kannada romantic drama film

Music
Excuse Me (album), by Salvador Sobral, 2016
Excuse Me (Ao Vivo), an album by Salvador Sobral, 2017
"Excuse Me" (Jazmine Sullivan song), 2011
"Excuse Me" (Salvador Sobral song), 2016
"Excuse Me (I Think I've Got a Heartache)", a song by Buck Owens, 1960
"Excuse Me", a song by AOA from Angel's Knock, 2017
"Excuse Me", a song by Bestie, 2015
"Excuse Me", a song by Kiki Dee, 1967
"Excuse Me", a song by Peter Gabriel from Peter Gabriel, 1977

See also
Excuse, a defense to criminal charges